A local urban district is a type of unincorporated community within the Canadian province of Manitoba. According to The Municipal Act, a local urban district is a locality wholly within a rural municipality that "has at least 250 residents and a population density of at least 400 residents per square kilometre or such other density as the minister may in a specific case consider sufficient for the type and level of services to be provided in the local urban district". The Local Urban Districts Regulation designates 65 unincorporated communities in Manitoba as local urban districts.

List

See also 
List of municipalities in Manitoba
List of cities in Manitoba
List of towns in Manitoba
List of villages in Manitoba
List of rural municipalities in Manitoba
List of communities in Manitoba
List of designated places in Manitoba
List of population centres in Manitoba

Notes

References 

Local urban districts